Massimo Mallegni (born 28 November 1968 in Pietrasanta) is an Italian politician. He is a senator of the Republic of Italy and is a member of the Legislature XVIII of Italy.

Biography 
Mallegni was born in Pietrasanta, in the province of Lucca. He is an entrepreneur in the tourism sector. In 1994, he joined Forza Italia. In 1994, he became councillor of the Province of Lucca, until 1997. In 1997, he became mayor in his native town, Pietrasanta, and was reelected three times: in 2000, in 2005 and in 2015. in 2016, Mallegni invited the artist Helidon Xhixha to hold an exhibition of his sculptures, working with local artisans to complete works in bronze and marble.

Election as Senator 
In 2017, he resigned as mayor in view of the following year's general elections, in which he was elected senator in 2018. In December 2019, he was among the 64 signatories (41 of which were from Forza Italia) for the confirmatory referendum on the decrease in the size of the parliament: a few months earlier, the Berlusconian senators had deserted the senate on the occasion of the vote on the constitutional reform.  At the beginning of January 2020, he withdrew his signature together with three other Forza Italia senators close to Mara Carfagna.

In August, with the regional elections in Tuscany, he was chosen as regional commissioner of Forza Italia after the resignation of the coordinator Stefano Mugnai.

References 

Living people
1968 births
People from Pietrasanta
Forza Italia politicians
21st-century Italian politicians
Senators of Legislature XVIII of Italy
Forza Italia (2013) senators
20th-century Italian people